"You Made a Wanted Man of Me" is a song written by Jeff Crossan, and recorded by American country music artist Ronnie McDowell.  It was released in October 1983 as the first single from the album Country Boy's Heart.  The song reached #3 on the Billboard Hot Country Singles & Tracks chart.

Chart performance

References

1984 singles
Ronnie McDowell songs
Song recordings produced by Buddy Killen
Epic Records singles
1983 songs